The Krishna "Dada" Kondke (Marathi pronunciation: [d̪aːd̪a koːɳɖke]; 8 August 1932 – 14 March 1998) was an Indian actor and film producer. He was one of the most renowned personalities in Marathi film industry, famous for his double entendre dialogues in movies.

Kondke was born into a family owning a grocery shop and owners of chawls in Morbaug area of Mumbai which were let out. His family members were also foreman handling millworkers of Bombay Dyeing. Dada Kondke was entered in the Guinness Book of World Records for the highest number of films (nine) that achieved silver jubilee (running for 25 consecutive weeks). Kondke was called "Dada", an honorific Marathi term meaning "elder brother", which led to his popular name Dada Kondke. He was credited with introducing the genre of sex comedy to Marathi cinema and Indian cinema.

Early life 
Kondke was a born to and raised in a Koli family of cotton-mill workers in a chawl in Naigaon, near Lalbaug, Mumbai. His family originally hailed from the village of Ingavali which was in the erstwhile Bhor State near Pune. Kondke and his migrant family retained close connections to their rural roots.
As a youngster, Kondke was a rough kid who later on took up job in a local grocery retail chain called Apna Bazaar. He lost his parents to unfortunate events and the grieving process changed him profoundly. Left alone with his elder brother Dhondiram and his family to take care of him, these events made him focus more on the lighter side of life and make people laugh. Kondke started his entertainment career with a band and then worked as a stage actor. While working for the drama companies, Kondke toured throughout Maharashtra which helped him understand the local population's taste in entertainment.

Career

Stage career
Kondke was involved in cultural activities of Seva Dal, a Congress party volunteers organization, where he started working in dramas. During this period came in contact with various Marathi stage personalities including writer, Vasant Sabnis. Later, Kondke started his own theatre company, and approached Sabnis to compose a drama script for him. Sabnis appreciated Dada's  performance in Khankhanpurcha Raja (Translation: Bankrupt King), and agreed to  write a modern Marathi language Tamasha or Loknatya (folk play). The drama  was named  Vichha Majhi Puri Kara (Translation: Fulfill my Wish). The drama went on to play over 1500 shows all over Maharashtra and made Dada a star.

Film career
Vichha Majhi Puri Kara brought Kondke into spotlight and in 1969, he debuted in Marathi movies through a role in Bhalji Pendharkar's movie Tambdi Maati which won the National Film Award for Best Feature Film in Marathi. He then turned producer with Songadya in 1971. Songadya was based on a story written by Vasant Sabnis, and was directed by Govind Kulkarni. He cast himself as Namya, the simpleton who falls for the glamour of Kalavati (played by Usha Chavan) who is a dancer. Some of the other people who played major characters in this movie were Nilu Phule, Ganpat Patil, Sampat Nikam and Ratnamala. Kondke retained his team from Songadya and delivered his next hit Eakta Jeev Sadashiv. Kondke's story-lines were always based on the simpleton engaged in lower level occupations. For example,  Kondke portrayed himself as a Dhobi (Laundry Man) in Aali Angavar, Poor Farmer in Songadya, and a Police Constable in Pandu Havaldar. Kondke is known for using the same team of actors, technicians and playback singers to repeat the formula for success that he believed he had got from his debut film. Many of his movies, produced under the "Kamakshi Pictures" banner, had Usha Chavan as the lead actress, Rajesh Mujumdar as screen play writer (from Pandu Hawaldar onward), Raam Laxman as music director, Jayawant Kulkarni and later Mahendra Kapoor as the male playback singer, Usha Mangeshkar as the female playback singer, and Bal Mohite as the chief assistant. Kondke often employed the veteran actor-dancer, Bhagwan Dada in dancing sequences in his films such as Aali Angavar, Hyoch Navra Pahije, Bot Lavin Tithe Gudgulya, and Ram Ram Gangaram. Teaming up with his nephew Vijay Kondke who later produced the blockbuster Maherchi Saadi, and Vijay's brothers, the Kondke family reached zenith of their careers and stayed united till Dada demised.

Filmography

Featured songs 
As a lyricist he wrote multiple songs on animals
 "Manasa paras medhara bari" (meaning 'goats are much better than human beings') in the film Ekta Jeev Sadashiv
 "Labaad Landga Dhwang Kartay" (on the cunningness of foxes) in Ekta Jeev Sadashiv
 "Chalara vaghya" (dog) in the film Tumcha Amcha Jamala
 "Jodi bailachi khillari" (bullocks) in the film Mala Gheun Chala
 "Bakricha samdyasni laglay lala" (goat) in the film Ram Ram Gangaram
Bhajans
 "Anjanichyā Sutā Tulā Rāmācha Vardān" in the film Tumcha Amcha Jamala

Political career
Balasaheb Thackeray, leader of the party Shiv Sena, helped Kondke with screenings of Songadya, when Dev Anand’s film, Tere Mere Sapne was released, and resulted in movie theatres replacing showings of Songadya, for it. The move angered Marathi-speaking moviegoers, as many were eager to watch Kondke's film. The news of the replacement reached the Sena Bhavan, and after a meeting, party members and locals marched to the theatre to protest the move.  Thackeray's justification for supporting Kondke was that he was a Marathi Māṇūs (Man). In return, Kondke, with Gajanan Shirke, helped found the Chitrapat Shakha'. 
Kondke was impressed with Thackeray's charisma and had toured Maharashtra to attract voters towards Shiv Sena. Kondke was a very active member of Shiv Sena and was able to influence many areas of rural Maharashtra due to his popularity and way of making fiery speeches to impress the masses.

 Personal life 
He was married to Nalini but they later got divorced. He did not remarry. On 14 March 1998, Dada Kondke is supposed to have suffered a heart attack at his residence Rama Niwas in Dadar, Mumbai. At the time, Kondke was working on the film Jaraa Dheer Dhara'' with Usha Chavan.

References

External links

The comic spirit
State institutes Dada Kondke award
Now even Kondke's book raises controversy
Dada Kondke: End of an era
Dada's Songs Direct Download
Dada Kondke pictures
More pictures of Dada Kondke from Marathi movies

People from Pune district
1932 births
1998 deaths
Male actors in Marathi cinema
Marathi film directors
20th-century Indian male actors
Male actors from Maharashtra
Film producers from Maharashtra
Maharashtra